Pierre-Joseph Proudhon is a biography of the French anarchist written by George Woodcock and first published in 1956 by Macmillan.

Further reading

External links 

 

1956 non-fiction books
Biographies about anarchists
Books by George Woodcock
English-language books
Pierre-Joseph Proudhon
Macmillan Publishers books